East Lulworth is a village and civil parish nine miles east of Dorchester, near Lulworth Cove, in the county of Dorset, South West England. It consists of 17th-century thatched cottages. The village is now dominated by the barracks of the Royal Armoured Corps Gunnery School who use a portion of the Purbeck Hills as a gunnery range. In 2013 the estimated population of the civil parish was 160.

The nearby Lulworth Estate grounds contain the first Roman Catholic chapel to be built since the time of the Protestant Reformation. It was designed in 1786 by John Tasker in the form of a Greek mausoleum at a cost of £2,380. It was the private chapel of the recusant Weld family. The Weld-Blundell family, formerly owners of the estate, were descendants of the Welds. 

The Church of England parish church is dedicated to St. Andrew. Only the perpendicular tower and octagonal font are original from the medieval building; the remainder of the church was built in 1864. It was designed by John Hicks, who also designed East Holme church.

Henry Rolls (1803-1877) was a shoemaker who taught himself to read and write. He kept a journal of the main happenings of village life from 1824 until 1877. After Henry's death, his son George Rolls (1846-1929) continued the journal, covering the period from 1877 to 1928. George's daughter Agnes Mary Rolls (1879-1961) then took over responsibility for the journal from 1929 to 1955.

See also 
 West Lulworth

References

The Buildings of England by John Newman and Nikolaus Pevsner. Page 195. Published by Penguin Books 1972. Reprint 1975.  (For churches).

External links 
 East Lulworth OPC - information on East Lulworth and its residents over the centuries
 Henry Rolls' Journal of Events 
 East Lulworth Local History
 Lulworth Online — Information on the villages

Hamlets in Dorset